Magarat is considered to be the place settled and inhabited by Magars, one of the largest indigenous ethnic groups of Nepal. It is a geographical cluster of Federal Republic of Nepal which existed in the modern territory of Nepal before the Unification of Nepal by Prithivi Narayan Shah. It extended from the Budhigandki River the West.

Magar Principalities Magars are martial people that first established their kingdom in present day western Nepal. They were animistic and shamanic in their religious practices. The Kham Magar of the upper Karnali basin and their brethren of the mid-hills of Nepal had a flourishing and empirical kingdom. Much archaeological proof of their existence can be found in the western mid-hills of Nepal. The Magar have a strong military and warrior tradition. However, their hospitality and concern for their fellow human beings is also legendary. Two waves of immigrants became the undoing of the Magar empire. Firstly, the Khasas were welcomed and assimilated within Magar empire. Secondly, due to the advance of Muslim forces into the Gangetic plains of India, the Brahmins entered the Magar empire as refugees. These two groups were given sanctuary in the Magar empire. The latter group of refugees started to impose their view of Hinduism upon the Magars, while the former group were given the status of Chettri by the latter group in accordance with their view of Hinduism. This left the Magar people boxed into the third tier in their own kingdom (the first being the Brahmins, the second being the newly elevated Chettri, previously the Khasas). This meant that the one-time rulers of the Nepali mid-hills became the ruled upon. This was the start of the degradation of the Magar empire. The introduction of Hinduism in itself became the cataclysmic event in the undoing of the Magar empire.

Aramudi, a name of legend  in the 8th century of Himalayan history, particularly the history of Kashmir & Ancinet Nepal . There was a war between King Aramudi & Kashmir King then Jayapida  Kashmir king was defeated and kept a prisoner in a fortress built high above the bank of the Kalagandika. The place where the Kashmiri king was kept temporarily is called by Kalhana ‘aśma-veśman’ "stone house which is now   Gulmi district, situated on the west bank of the Kali Gandaki;  Aramudi was none other than king Baradev of ancient  Nepal.  Ancient Nepal was ruled by King Baradev who had made Lalitpattan, present day Lalitpur, his capital.Battle between Aramudi and King Jayapida  was happened in the heartland of Magar which was Magarat during at that time.

Aramudi’ sounds an indigenous Magar name with an inflection ‘di’ suggesting – ‘water’ and also ‘river’ . At the morphophonemic level in ‘Aramudi’ - there are four morphemes or segments  ‘a’ + ‘ra’ + ‘mu’ + di’ or ‘mo + di’. If we conjugated these four morphemes into intelligible sounds: it would either become “aramu + di” or “ara’ + ‘mudi or modi”. In Magar language of Kali Gandaki region ‘aramu’ or ‘armu’ means ‘sweet smell’ and ‘di’ means ‘water’ - hence literally “aramu + di” means ‘sweet smelling water’ – which should also mean - ‘sweet tasting spring water, also in Nepali ‘jharanako mitho pani’.  The ‘di’ in ‘Aramudi’ is definitively suggestive of ‘water’ in the Magar language.  In the Kali Gandaki region and western Nepal, names for rivers, small streams, towns and villages are still in Magars language. Such as Marshyang+di river in Tanahu, ‘Lang+di’, ‘Darang+di’; ’Lun+di’ in Gorkha, ‘Hosrang+di’ village in Parbat, Chhang+di in Tanahu, ‘Argaun+di’ village, ‘Hug+di’ in Plapa district.  These are only few names here to understand how the ‘di’ element has influenced the ancient and contemporary history and society of Nepal. During the period of Magarat ( Confideration of Twelve Magarat & Eighteen Magarat ) There was a strong kingdom called Palpa where  Palpali King was  ‘Mukunda Sen  Magar” in Naradsmriti Granth. He waged a war against Nepal [KathmanduValley] twice in 1521 Bikram Era and on Chaitra 11,1522 Bikram Era . During the ages of Magarat

Mansingh Khadka Magar was a king of Uppalokot until 1559. There was always been a running event called  Liglig Daud annually  where winner of race was chosen as King Of Ligligkot Kingdom Dravya Shah ( Youngest Son Of Yashobrahma) was invited to take over a throne  by the Brahmins in particular Bhagirath Panth and Ganesh Pande. HE was physically good to run in an event and Won. On Wednesday the 8th of Bhadon Badi, Saka 1481 (A.D. 1559) Rohini Nakshatra  being an auspicious day, Dravya Shah  was aided by Bhagirath Panth, Ganesa Pande, Gangaram Rana Magar, Busal Arjyal, Khanal Bohra and Murli Khawas of Ligligkot. Ganesa Pande had collected all the people of who wore the brahmanical thread such as the Thapas, Busals, Ranas and Maski Ranas of the Magar tribe, they went by the Dahya Gauda route and the Durbar. At the same auspicious moment Dravya took his seat on the gaddi and named the new Kingdom Gorkha.Dravya Shah used the army of the Khas Thakuri and Magar (an ancient tribe of Nepal) to invade neighboring states and his successors continued this aggression to increase the territory belonging to Gorkha By 1570, when Dravya Shah died, the running race was but a memory among the people.

Different kingdoms such as Rishing, Ghiring, Argha, Khachhi, Gulmi, Dhor, Satung, Paiung, Bhirkot, Gharung Mishikot, Isma were collectively known as 'Barha Magarat' or Confederation of Twelve Magar Kingdoms and were ruled by Magar Kings. Each year, people celebrate a festival of Barhakune Tal in Ghorahi of Dang district to commemorate the founding of Twelve Magarats. Similarly, there existed 'Athara Magarat' or Confederation of Eighteen Magar Kingdoms located west of Kali Gandaki River, primarily inhabited by Kham Magars. Palpa district and Rolpa district of Nepal (majority of Kham Magars), both located in Province 5 of Nepal, are the top two districts of Nepal with the highest indigenous Magar population.
Regions of Nepal

References

Geography of Nepal